Raphael John "Ralph" Gil Eigenmann (25 September 1961 – 1 September 2014), known professionally as Mark Gil, was a Filipino actor. Gil was often cast as a main villain in Philippine action films that was popular during the late 80s to the early 2000s.

Gil was also widely known for playing the protagonist of the critically-acclaimed 1982 film Batch '81 and the role of Lorna Tolentino's former Filipino-American boss-lover-killer in the drama-suspense thriller The Elsa Castillo Story: The Chop-Chop Lady, the script of which is inspired by true events. He also appeared in several drama series, the last of which was the ABS-CBN drama The Legal Wife, starring Angel Locsin and Jericho Rosales.

Personal life
He was the middle child of actors Eddie Mesa and Rosemarie Gil, and brother of actors Michael de Mesa and Cherie Gil.

He is the father of singer/actor Gabby Eigenmann and Katherine "Ira" Eigenmann by model/actress and then-girlfriend Irene Celebre. He was sixteen years old when he had his first born Gabby. Timothy (a.k.a. Sid Lucero) and Maxine Eve are his children by his first wife, actress Bing Pimentel. Andi Eigenmann is his daughter with actress Jaclyn Jose. Gil married his second wife, non-showbiz Maricar Jacinto, in 1996; the couple had one child, Stephanie ("Stevie").

Death
Gil died on 1 September 2014, aged 52, of cirrhosis of the liver, stemming from cancer of the liver, 24 days before his 53rd birthday. He was survived by his wife Maricar, six children and seven grandchildren.

Filmography

Film

Television

References

External links

1961 births
2014 deaths
Filipino male television actors
Filipino male child actors
People from Manila
Filipino people of Kapampangan descent
Filipino people of German descent
Filipino people of Spanish descent
Filipino people of Swiss descent
Filipino male comedians
GMA Network personalities
ABS-CBN personalities
TV5 (Philippine TV network) personalities
Deaths from cirrhosis
Deaths from liver cancer
Deaths from cancer in the Philippines
Mark
Filipino male film actors